Mattheus Marinus "Matthieu" van Eijsden (26 April 1896, in Amersfoort – 8 November 1970, in Haarlem) was a Dutch film and television actor. (His name was often spelled Van Eysden).

Selected filmography

 The Bluejackets (1922)
 Artistenrevue (1926)
 Het Meisje met den Blauwen Hoed (1934)
 Op Hoop van Zegen (1934)
 The Trouble With Money (1936)
 Kermisgasten (1936)
 Pygmalion (1937)
 Forty Years (1938)
 De Big van het Regiment (1939)
 Ergens in Nederland (1940)
 Drie Weken Huisknecht (1944)
 But Not in Vain (1948)
 A Dog of Flanders (1959)

Bibliography
 Mathijs, Ernest. The Cinema of the Low Countries. Wallflower Press, 2004.

External links

1896 births
1970 deaths
Dutch male film actors
Dutch male silent film actors
Dutch male television actors
People from Amersfoort
20th-century Dutch male actors